Santipap Yaemsaen (born 1 March 2000) is a Thai professional footballer who plays as an centre back for Thai League 1 club Bangkok United.

International Goals

Under-16

References

External links
Santipap Yaemsaen at Soccerway

2000 births
Living people
Santipap Yaemsaen
Santipap Yaemsaen
Association football defenders
Santipap Yaemsaen
Santipap Yaemsaen
Santipap Yaemsaen
Santipap Yaemsaen
Santipap Yaemsaen